The 1999 IAAF Golden League was the second edition of the annual international track and field meeting series, held from 30 June to 7 September. It was contested at seven European meetings: the Bislett Games, Golden Gala, Meeting de Paris, Herculis, Weltklasse Zürich, Memorial Van Damme and the Internationales Stadionfest (ISTAF).

The Golden League jackpot consisted of 50 kilograms of gold bars. The jackpot was available to athletes who won at least five of the seven competitions of the series in one of the 13 specified events (8 for men, 5 for women). The jackpot events for 1999 were:
Men: 200 m, 800 m, 5000 m, 110 m hurdles, 3000 m steeplechase, long jump, pole vault, javelin throw
Women: 200 m, 800 m, 3000 m, 400 m hurdles, high jump

The jackpot winners were Gabriela Szabo of Romania (3000 metres) and Wilson Kipketer of Denmark (800 metres). Kenya's Bernard Barmasai came within half a second of sharing the jackpot: after amassing six straight wins in the steeplechase, he lost to Ali Ezzine by 0.32 seconds. Marion Jones won the first five women's 200 m races, but did not compete in the last two meetings.

Results

Men

Women

References

Results
Oslo
Paris
Rome
Monaco
Zurich
Brussels
Berlin

Golden League
IAAF Golden League
1999 in European sport